Nintulla or Nintul was a god in Sumerian religion, and one of the eight deities born to relieve the illness of Enki. Enki designated him lord of Magan.

References

Mesopotamian gods